Shravana Kumara is a character mentioned in the ancient Hindu text Ramayana. He is best known for his filial piety towards his parents. He was killed accidentally by Prince Dasharatha.

Life 

Shravana Kumara's parents, Shantanu and Gyanvanti (Malaya), were hermits. They were both blind. When they became aged, Shravana wanted them to take to the four most sacred places of Hindu pilgrimage to purify the soul. Since Shravana Kumara could not afford the transport, he decided to put each parent in a basket and tie each basket to an end of a bamboo pole, which he would carry on his shoulder while on their pilgrimage.

According to Punjabi folklore, Shravana's mother was distantly related to King Dasharatha.

Death 

According to the Ramayana, while hunting in the forest of Ayodhya, the then-Prince Dasharatha heard a sound near a lake and shot an arrow, hoping to hit an animal. When he crossed the lake to collect his kill, he found that his arrow had fatally struck a teenage boy who was bleeding. The injured boy was Shravana, who then told Dasharatha he had come to the lake to collect water for his sick and aged parents, who were both blind and whom he had been carrying on a sling. With his dying breath, Shravana requested Dasharatha to take water to his parents and to tell them what happened.

Shravana then succumbed to his wounds. When Dasharatha took water for his parents and told them of his tragic mistake, they were unable to bear the shock. Despite acknowledging that it was an accident, they cursed Dasharatha that he too would experience 'Putrashoka' (Sanskrit, 'putra' is child/son and shoka' is sorrow, or grief; grief due to loss of a son). Thus, Shravana's sick and thirsty parents died without drinking water. 

This curse came true when King Dasharatha died without seeing his eldest and most beloved son, Rama, who had to be exiled at the former's own orders (upon the wishes of the latter's step-mother, queen Kaikeyi).

 Legacy 

Local tradition holds that the place where Shravana died was named 'Sarvan' in Unnao district of Uttar Pradesh in India, and the spot where Dasharatha shot his arrow came to be known as 'Sarwara' and the place where Shravana's parents died is called 'Samadha. An old and dilapidated memorial for Shravana on the banks of the lake is now withering away.

Shrine
Mukhed in Nanded district of Maharashtra has a samadhi dedicated to Shravana.

See also 
 Hindu text
 Kosala kingdom
 Sarayu

References 

Sages in the Ramayana
Rishis